Peprilus simillimus is ray-finned fish in the family Stromateidae and therefore belongs to the order Scombiformes. The fish can reach a length of 28 centimeters.

Habitat 
Peprilus simillimus is a saltwater fish. The fish prefers a subtropical climate and lives mainly in the Pacific Ocean. The depth spread is 9 to 91 meters below the surface of the water.

Relationship to humans 
Peprilus simillimus is of considerable commercial importance for fishing. In angling, little is hunted for the fish.

References 

 Froese, R., D. Pauly. and editors. 2005 FishBase Electronic publication. www.fishbase.org, version 06/2005.

 ↑ Peprilus simillimus on the IUCN Red List of Threatened Species.

External links 

 Pictures of Peprilus simillimus on FishBase

Stromateidae
Taxa named by William Orville Ayres
Fish described in 1860
Fish of the Pacific Ocean